The Janam Asthan Guru Ram Das is a gurdwara in Lahore, Pakistan. The gurdwara was built atop the site traditionally believed to be the location of the birthplace and childhood home of Guru Ram Das, the 4th Sikh gurus.

Location
The gurdwara is located in the Chuna Mandi Bazaar in the Walled City of Lahore, near the Lahore Fort, and Begum Shahi Mosque. The shrine is located along the Shahi Guzargah, or "Royal Passage" that began at Delhi Gate, and terminated at the Lahore Fort.

History

Guru Ram Das was born in the Chuna Mandi Bazaar of Lahore in 1534 CE. 

The childhood home existed until the era of Maharaja Ranjit Singh, who purportedly was asked to build a new shrine at the site during the birth celebrations of Kharak Singh in 1801. Ranjit Singh agreed to the request, and acquired plots surrounding the site in order to build a new gurdwara. 18 Sikhs were reportedly killed in the gurdwara premises during communal rioting that occurred during the Partition of British India.

Architecture
The shrine was built atop a white marble platform, which is built several steps above street-level. The shrine measures 122 feet 6 inches by 97 feet 6 inches. To the west of the shrine is an open courtyard, surrounded on two sides by a two-story building.

Management
The shrine is managed by the Evacuee Trust Department of the Government of Pakistan. Readings from the Guru Granth Sahib are carried out daily at the shrine.

Gallery

See also
 Guru Ram Das
 Sikhism

References

Gurdwaras in Pakistan
Religious buildings and structures in Punjab, Pakistan
19th-century gurdwaras